Hildebrand Elwell (fl. 1417–1431) of Wells, Somerset, was an English politician.

Family
He was the brother of Wells MP, Robert Elwell. Hildebrand married a widow.

Career
He was a Member (MP) of the Parliament of England for Wells in 1417, 1420, May 1421 and 1431.

References

Year of birth missing
15th-century deaths
English MPs 1417
People from Wells, Somerset
English MPs 1420
English MPs May 1421
English MPs 1431